Ariadne Crater is a crater on Venus. Its central peak serves as the prime meridian of the planet, a status formerly held by Eve Crater until relocated.

References

External links
 Ariadne at the Gazetteer of Planetary Nomenclature
 Ariadne at the Venus Crater Database

Impact craters on Venus
Prime meridians